Igor R. Klebanov (born March 29, 1962) is an American theoretical physicist. Since 1989, he has been a faculty member at Princeton University where he is currently a Eugene Higgins Professor of Physics and the Director of the Princeton Center for Theoretical Science. In 2016, he was elected to the National Academy of Sciences. Since 2022, he is the Director of the Simons Collaboration on Confinement and QCD Strings.

Biography 
Klebanov grew up in Kharkiv and emigrated to the U.S. with his parents and sister when he was 16. He received his undergraduate education at MIT (class of 1982) and his Ph.D. degree at Princeton University in 1986 as a student of Curtis Callan.
In his thesis he made advances in the Skyrme model of hadrons, which included the first paper on a Skyrmion crystal.
Klebanov worked as a post-doc in the SLAC Theory Group.
His main contributions to string theory are in Matrix model approaches to two-dimensional strings, in brane dynamics, and in the gauge theory-gravity duality.
His work in 1996-97 on relations between branes in supergravity and their gauge theory description anticipated the gauge theory-gravity correspondence.

Klebanov's 1998 paper with his graduate student Gubser, and Polyakov, which made a precise statement of the AdS/CFT duality, is among the all-time top cited papers in high-energy physics (it has over 11,500 citations according to Google Scholar).
A series of papers by Klebanov and collaborators on D-branes on the conifold has led to discovery  of cascading gauge theory. Its dual warped throat provides a geometric description of color confinement and chiral symmetry breaking; it has been used in model building for cosmology and particle physics. The relation between 3-dimensional critical O(N) model and bosonic higher-spin gauge theory in 4-dimensional AdS space has been called the Klebanov-Polyakov correspondence.

Klebanov's more recent work includes the Entanglement Entropy in confining gauge theories, the F-theorem for Renormalization Group flows, large N tensor models,  field theory descriptions of critical phenomena, and quantum many-body scars as group invariant states.

Honors
2010 Guggenheim Fellowship
2010 Princeton University Graduate Mentoring Award
2012 Elected to the American Academy of Arts and Sciences.
2014 Tomassoni awards
2016 Elected to the U.S. National Academy of Sciences.
2017 Pomeranchuk Prize
2022 Oskar Klein Medal

Works
 hep-th/9108019 "String Theory in Two Dimensions", High Energy Physics - Theory (hep-th) Igor R. Klebanov, 26 Aug 1991
 
 
 
 
 "Some stringy aspects of the AdS/CFT duality", Strings 2002, Igor Klebanov
 Solving Quantum Field Theories via Curved Spacetimes, Physics Today, Igor Klebanov and Juan Maldacena

References

External links
 List of his papers on Arxiv
 List of his papers on Google Scholar
 An interview on his most famous work
 List of most cited physicists in brane physics
 Igor R Klebanov" , Scientific commons
 

21st-century American physicists
Soviet emigrants to the United States
Living people
American string theorists
Massachusetts Institute of Technology alumni
Princeton University alumni
Princeton University faculty
Fellows of the American Academy of Arts and Sciences
Members of the United States National Academy of Sciences
1962 births